DCHS may refer to:
 Daughters of Charity Health System, a hospital chain in California, United States
 Deep Creek Hot Springs, natural hot springs located in San Bernardino National Forest, California, United States
 Dickinson County Healthcare System, a hospital in Iron Mountain, Michigan, United States
 Douglas County Historical Society, Nebraska, United States
 Dame Commander of the Order of the Holy Sepulchre, a Roman Catholic order of knighthood under the protection of the pope

Schools 
 Philippines
 Davao Christian High School, Davao City

 United Kingdom
 Dr Challoner's High School, Buckinghamshire, England
 Drummond Community High School, Edinburgh, Scotland
 The Duchess Community High school, Alnwick, Northumberland, England

 United States
 Danville Community High School, Danville, Indiana
 David Crockett High School, Jonesborough, Tennessee
 Davie County High School, Mocksville, North Carolina
 Daviess County High School, Owensboro, Kentucky
 Decatur Central High School, Indianapolis, Indiana
 Deep Creek High School, Chesapeake, Virginia
 DeKalb County High School, Smithville, Tennessee
 Del City High School, Del City, Oklahoma
 Delta Charter High School, Tracy, California
 Denver City High School (Texas), Denver City, Texas
 Desales Catholic High School (Walla Walla, Washington)
 Divine Child High School, Dearborn, Michigan
 Dodge City High School, Dodge City, Kansas
 Dodge County High School, Eastman, Georgia
 Dougherty Comprehensive High School, Albany, Georgia
 Douglas County High School (Colorado)
 Douglas County High School (Douglasville, Georgia)
 Douglas County High School (Nevada)
 Dowling Catholic High School, West Des Moines, Iowa
 Drew Central High School, Monticello, Arkansas
 Dundee-Crown High School, Carpentersville, Illinois
 Dyer County High School, Newbern, Tennessee